The City of Doncaster & Templestowe was a local government area about  east-northeast of Melbourne, the state capital of Victoria, Australia. At its peak in the early 1990s, it had a population of just over 100,000.

History

The origin of local government in the area dates back to 19 December 1856, when the Templestowe Road District was formed, following a public meeting and election at Bulleen Hotel. Two decades later, on 7 May 1875, the Shire of Bulleen was formed, incorporating the Roads Board area and Warrandyte. On 30 May 1890, the Doncaster Riding was severed and incorporated as the Shire of Doncaster, meeting in the old Shire Hall in Council Street. By this time, fruit growing had become the mainstay of Doncaster's rural economy. The Shire of Bulleen was renamed to the Shire of Templestowe on 12 May 1892, and reunited with Doncaster 23 years later under local government reforms on 1 October 1915, with the combined entity named the Shire of Doncaster & Templestowe on 16 March 1926. Urbanisation was slow to reach the area, and the 1949 Australian Blue Book described the shire as "mainly undulating country with extensive views [and] some low, hilly ranges". Agricultural activities, such as fruit growing, dairying and sheep and cattle grazing, dominated the shire's economic life. By 1955, the population of the area had grown with suburban settlement and a new Shire Hall was built. On 28 February 1967, at a time of rapid suburban growth, Doncaster & Templestowe was proclaimed a city.

On 15 December 1994, the City of Doncaster & Templestowe was abolished, and along with the Wonga Park area from the Shire of Lillydale, was merged into the newly created City of Manningham.

At the time of dissolution, council meetings were held in the Municipal Offices, in Doncaster Road, Doncaster. This facility is still used for the same purpose by the City of Manningham.

Land zoning
The City of Doncaster & Templestowe had about three hundred parks by the 1990s.

Wards

The City of Doncaster & Templestowe was subdivided into four wards, each electing three councillors:
 Doncaster Ward
 Doncaster West Ward
 Templestowe Ward
 Warrandyte Ward

Suburbs
 Bulleen
 Doncaster*
 Doncaster East
 Donvale
 Mitcham (shared with the City of Nunawading)
 Park Orchards
 Ringwood North (shared with the City of Ringwood)
 Templestowe
 Templestowe Lower
 Warrandyte
 Warrandyte South (shared with the Shire of Lillydale)
 Warranwood

* Council seat.

Population

* Estimate in the 1958 Victorian Year Book.

References

External links
 Victorian Places - Doncaster and Templestowe

Doncaster
City of Manningham
1856 establishments in Australia
1994 disestablishments in Australia